Lawrence Macdonald sometimes Laurence Macdonald (15 February 1799 – 4 March 1878) was a Scottish sculptor.

Life
Macdonald was born on 15 February 1799 at Findo Gask in Perthshire, Scotland to Margaret Morison and Alexander Macdonald, a violinist.

He was apprenticed as a stonemason with Thomas Gibson, who was then building the Murray Royal Asylum, outside Perth, and about this time he carved the arms of Robert Graeme on the front of Garvock House. Coming to Edinburgh with an introduction to the architect James Gillespie Graham, who proved a helpful patron, he worked as an ornamental sculptor. On 26 February 1822 he entered the Trustees' Academy, Edinburgh, then on Picardy Place.

In late 1822 he went to Rome to study, where he executed several busts, among others that of the John Murray, 4th Duke of Atholl. In 1823, along with Gibson, Severn, and other artists, he founded the British Academy of Arts in Rome, of which he continued as a trustee until his death.

After approximately four year he returned to Edinburgh, and there produced busts of Professor John Wilson and George Combe, the phrenologist. In 1829, he sent his bust of John Marshall, MP, to the Royal Academy, and he was a frequent contributor to the succeeding exhibitions. In the autumn of 1829, he exhibited in the Royal Institution, Edinburgh, his colossal group of 'Ajax bearing the dead body of Patroclus and combating 'an warrior' and other works; and he was second to his friend Charles Maclaren, editor of the 'Scotsman,‘ in his bloodless duel with Dr. James Browne, editor of the 'Caledonian Mercury,’ fought near Edinburgh in November 1829, which arose partly out of an article in the 'Mercury' (6 November) on Macdonald's works and the 'Scotsman's' criticisms upon them. In the same year he was elected a member of the Scottish Academy, where in 1832, he exhibited several busts, including those of J. Gibson Lochhart and the Earl Erroll; but he seldom contributed here, and resigned his membership in 1858. He appeared in the list of honorary members in 1867. At this time he is shown as living at 10 Cumberland Street in Edinburgh's Second New Town.

In 1832 he returned to Rome, where he occupied a leading position as a sculptor, chiefly producing portrait busts, aided by his elder brother, John, and his son, Alexander. His bust of Philip Henry, fifth Earl Stanhope, is now at Chevening, Kent, and a copy is in the National Portrait Gallery, London. 

He also executed busts of Walter Scott (1831), Fanny Kemble, Sir David Baird. and James Gillespie Graham. Among his ideal works are 'A Girl and a Carrier Pigeon,’ 1835, and 'Eurydice,’ 1849. His 'Ulysses recognised by his dog,’ shown in the Paris Exhibition of 1855, was much admired, and became the property of Lord Kilmorey. 

He died in Rome.

Several sculptors trained under him, including William Brodie.

Principal Works
Whilst Macdonald made statues of classical and mythological figures, all his portraiture was in the form of busts.

James Gillespie Graham (1827)
The Duke of Atholl, Blair Atholl, (1827)
Robert Phillips, (1829)
Earl of Errol (1832)
Viscountess Canning, Highcliffe Castle (1838)
Lord Alexander Russell, Woburn Abbey (1839)
Lady Ebury, Apsley House (1839)
Lord Charles Montagu, Kimbolton Castle (1840)
Sir Henry Taylor, National Portrait Gallery, London (1843)
Lord Compton, Castle Ashby (1843)
Mary Somerville, (1844)
The Duke of Cambridge, Windsor Castle (1846)
The Hon Mrs Sidney Herbert, Wilton House (1848)
Statue of Hyacinthus, Windsor Castle (1852)
Duke of Northumberland (1853)
Earl Stanhope, Chevening House, Kent (1854)
Bacchante at the Bath, Mount Stewart (1856)
Venus at the Bath, Mount Stewart (1856)
Watts Russell, Ilam Church, Staffordshire (1863)
Earl Stanhope, Chevening, Kent (n.d.)
George Combe, Scottish National Portrait Gallery (n.d.)
Euphemia Murray, Perth Museum (n.d.)

In Literature

Letitia Elizabeth Landon published her poem Lines. Supposed to be the Prayer of the Supplicating Nymph in Mr. Lawrence Macdonald’s Exhibition of Sculptures in the Literary Gazette in 1831.

References
List of works selected from the Dictionary of British Sculptors, 1660–1851, by Rupert Gunnis

Attribution

Scottish sculptors
Scottish male sculptors
British emigrants to Italy
1799 births
1878 deaths
People from Perth and Kinross
Alumni of the Edinburgh College of Art
Burials in the Protestant Cemetery, Rome